Aenigmatanthera is a genus of flowering plants belonging to the family Malpighiaceae.

Its native range is Brazil.

Species:

Aenigmatanthera doniana 
Aenigmatanthera lasiandra

References

Malpighiaceae
Malpighiaceae genera